The Train 2T, 4T and 6T were low power piston engines for light aircraft, produced in France. They were inverted, air-cooled in-line engines with the same bore and stroke, differing chiefly in the number of cylinders.

Design and development

In the 1930s Train introduced a series of air-cooled, inverted in-line piston engines for light aircraft. The T series all used the same cylinders, pistons, connecting rods, valve trains and ignition system, combined into 2 (2T), 4 (4T), and 6 (6T) cylinder units of the same layout. The number of crankshaft bearings (3, 5 or 7) and throws (2, 4 or 6) naturally depended on the number of cylinders, as did the number of cams (4, 8 or 12) on the underhead camshaft.

Operational history
Several International 2-litre Class records were set in 1937 by aircraft powered by the Train 4T.

Six Train 4Ts were used in the 2 seat,  span Potez-CAMS 160 flying boat, a 1:2.6 scale model of the large Potez-CAMS 161 aircraft.

Variants
From Jane's All the World's Aircraft 1938 unless noted

Train 2T
2-cylinders, 

Train 4T
4-cylinders, 
Train 4A -  variant of the 4T
Train 4E -  variant of the 4T

Train 6T
6-cylinders,  

Train 6C-01
 Powered the Tokyo Imperial University LB-2

Train 6D
6-cylinders,

Applications
From Jane's All the World's Aircraft 1938 and www.AviaFrance

4-cylinder models

Brochet MB.50 (4T)
 Carmier T.10 (4A)
Caudron C.344 (4T)
Chilton D.W.1A (4T)
Druine Aigle 777 (4T)
Duverne-Saran (4T)
Hennion 01 (4A 01)
Kellner-Béchereau E.1 (4T)
Mauboussin Hémiptère (4T)
Morane-Saulnier MS-660 (4E-01)
Nicolas-Claude NC-2 Aquilon (4E-01?)
Payen AP-10 (4T)
Potez-CAMS 160 (4T or 4A-01)
Régnier 12 (4T)
Touya aircraft (4T)
Trébucien Sport (4T)

6-cylinder models

Aubert PA-20 Cigale (6T)
Duverne-Saran 01 (6T)
Kellner-Béchereau EC.4 (6T)
Kellner-Béchereau ED.5 (6T)
S.E.C.A.T. S.4 Mouette
SECAT VI La Mouette (6T)
SFAN 5 (6T)
Volland V-10 (6T)

Specifications (4T)

See also

References

1930s aircraft piston engines